Barbara Adair is a South African writer. Her 2004 novel, In Tangier We Killed the Blue Parrot, was shortlisted for the Sunday Times Literary Award and the novel END was shortlisted for the  Commonwealth Book Prize. Based in Johannesburg, she also lectures on human rights law.

Novels published: 
 2004: In Tangier We Killed the Blue Parrot, Jacana, 2005, a fictional account of the lives of Paul Bowles and Jane Bowles in Tangier. (Short listed for the Sunday Times Fiction award, 2005. The subject of a conference paper: Urban Generations in Morocco, 2007, Cheryl Stobie: Somatics, Space, Surprise: Creative Dissonance over Time, University of KwaZulu Natal, South Africa.)
 2007: END, Jacana, 2009, a pastiche based on the movie Casablanca set in Johannesburg and Maputo. (Short listed for the African Regional Commonwealth Prize, 2010. The subject of a PhD dissertation: Beppi Chiuppani, Beyond Political engagement? Redefining the Literary in post dictatorship Brazil and post-apartheid South Africa, University of Chicago, 2013.)

Also, newspaper and magazine articles in: Sunday Independent (South Africa), Sunday Times (South Africa), Weekender (South Africa), Horizon (British Airways), Selamta (Ethiopian Airways). Short Stories in: New Contrast Literary Journal (South Africa), From the Great Wall to the Grand Canyon (US publication), Queer Africa – New and Collected Fiction: A collection of Southern African short stories (winner of the LAMDA (USA) prize for collected stories.)

Bibliography

External links
Official website

References 

South African women novelists
Year of birth missing (living people)
Place of birth missing (living people)
People from Johannesburg
Living people
21st-century South African novelists
21st-century South African women writers
South African women